CD-73°375 is a binary star located in the constellation Volans about  away. The two components, HR 2979 and HR 2980, are separated by two arc-seconds. The pair has a combined apparent magnitude of 6.34.

Properties 

The two stars making up CD-73°375 are both B9 subgiants with almost identical properties. HR 2979 is generally designated as the primary because of its higher mass, although HR 2980 is marginally brighter at magnitude 7.02.

References 

Volans (constellation)
B-type subgiants
Binary stars
2979 80
62153 4
036914
Durchmusterung objects